Michael Arvaarluk Kusugak (Inuktitut: ᐊᕐᕚᕐᓗᒃ ᑯᓱᒐᖅ) is a storyteller and a Canadian Inuk children's writer, who tells stories about Arctic and Inuit culture. He was born April 27, 1948, just north of Chesterfield Inlet, at a point of land called Qatiktalik (known as Cape Fullterton in English).  That same spring of 1948 he and his family moved to Repulse Bay and in 1960 to Rankin Inlet. In 2019, he lives in Sooke, British Columbia and plans to move to Manitoba in the summer.

In 1954, a plane arrived and at the age of six, Michael Kusugak and many of his friends were sent away to residential school. The teachers were strict and did not allow the children to speak their own language, Inuktitut.  Kusugak remembers sitting in the back of the class crying most of the time. The following year, Michael successfully hid when the plane came to take him and his friends away again. However, he returned the following year and became one of the first Inuit in the eastern Arctic to graduate from high school. He was also educated in Yellowknife, Churchill and Saskatoon. He has later worked as an educational administrator for Nunavut Arctic College.

Michael Kusugak grew up living a traditional, nomadic Inuit life with his family. Every night, Michael pleaded with his grandmother to tell him a story, until she eventually gave in. In this environment, Michael's love of storytelling was born. It wasn't until Michael had his own children that he realized that there was hardly anything written for children about life in the Arctic, so he started telling them his grandmother's stories. In the late 1980s, Robert Munsch visited a local school and stayed in the Kusugak household. Along with Munsch as a co-author, Michael wrote his first book, A Promise is a Promise, published in 1988. Michael Arvaarluk Kusugak has been writing ever since. His books have been published in French, Korean, Japanese and Braille.

All of Kusugak's books, except for T is for Territories, which is part of a non-fiction series, are illustrated by Vladyana Krykorka. Krykorka came to Toronto from Prague when the Soviet Union invaded Czechoslovakia. She illustrated A Promise is a Promise in 1988, and since then has been to Nunavut many times to visit, photograph and paint the land and people. She has also written and illustrated a set of her own books depicting the land and animals of the north: Arctic Land, Arctic Sea, and Arctic Sky.  

Ijiraq, Kiviuq, and Siarnaq, moons of Saturn, were named by astronomer John J. Kavelaars after encountering the figures in one of Kusugak's books. Paaliaq, another moon, was named after one of Kusugak's original characters featured in The Curse Of The Shaman: A Marble Island.

Reception

Kusugak holds a unique place in Canadian children's literature, speaking from "the in-between of cultures" and finding common ground that relates to the very different parts of Canada. He is valued not only for the captivating content of his books, but also for his role as one of very few Inuit authors, and his commitment to sharing stories. Kusugak has to take stories that he naturally tells out loud in Inuktituk, and put them into writing in English. He rehearses his stories first out loud, and his books are praised for having "the well-worn feeling of an old, much-told tale".

Michael Kusugak is known for his power to keep large groups of kids captivated for long periods of time with his stories. He is a storyteller, not only a writer of children's books, and spends a lot of his time telling stories to children in schools and libraries. At these events, he doesn't read his books out loud; he tells stories that he heard as a child and stories from his own life. "Before books, or even reading, should come the story, says Inuit storyteller and children's author Michael Kusugak. It should be told in person, with lots of repetition, facial expressions and feedback from listeners," he says. "You can take these stories and write them down, but I think you lose something if you don't actually go and tell them".

His stories stimulate interesting questions and prompt classroom discussion.  They seem to have a power in their unique nature and topics. A group of teachers who introduced their classes to Kusugak's books reported that their students were keenly interested in learning more about Canada. Rich discussions were held in classrooms and the children expressed pride in being part of such a large country with diversity in geography and people. They often asked challenging questions about life in the various regions of Canada.

Awards

Winner of the Ruth Schwartz Award for Children's Literature for Northern Lights: The Soccer Trails in 1994.

Winner of the Vicky Metcalf Award for Children's Literature in 2008.

Kusugak has also been shortlisted for many other awards 

The Hnatyshyn Foundation, REVEAL Indigenous Art Awards, Laureate (2017)

Themes
Kusugak's work reflects many of the common themes in Canadian Indigenous children's literature. In his books, many of the heroes are strong female protagonists, girls who get themselves out of tight situations by being clever and resourceful. This is one of the ways that Indigenous authors try to counteract the particularly harsh destruction of Indigenous women, by European colonizers.

Another theme is Kusugak's focus on home and family, and the essential role of elders, particularly grandmothers. This is common as a way for Aboriginal authors to create positive cultural associations for children, and a positive image of home, which includes ‘the land’ much more than a physical house in Kusugak's stories. Often, his main characters are warned by a parent or grandparent about a potential danger, but don't believe them. In the end, they learn their lesson the hard way and learn to trust the knowledge of their elders.

In Kusugak's first book, A Promise is a Promise, a girl named Allashua decides that her mother's warnings about the sea ice must be wrong, and decides to go and play near the cracks in the spring ice. She is taken by creatures who live under the ice, the Qallupilluit, who crave children but have promised never to take children who are with their parents. Allashua makes a bargain with the creatures, and promises that she will bring them more children if they let her go. She gets all the way back home before freezing solid, and after her parents warm her up, she tells them what she promised. They come up with a plan and together outwit the Qallupilluit, so Allashua and all her brothers and sisters are safe.

Works

Michael Kusugak has written picture books, young readers’ novels and chapter books, and one non-fiction picture book. 
 A Promise is a Promise (co-authored with Robert Munsch, 1989)
 Baseball Bats for Christmas (1990)
 Hide and Sneak (1992)
 Northern Lights: The Soccer Trails (1993)
 My Arctic 1,2,3 (1996)
 Arctic Stories (1998)
 Who Wants Rocks? (1999)
 The Curse of the Shaman, A Marble Island Story (2006)
 The Littlest Sled Dog (2008)
 T is for Territories: A Yukon, Northwest Territories, and Nunavut Alphabet (2013)
Baby Arctic Animals (2014)
Birds Come and Go (2014)
A Dog Team (2014)
I Build an Igloo (2014)
Snow (2014)
On Waiting (Illustrated by Susan Thurston Shirley, 2016)
Inuit,Tundra and Ravens (2017)

References

Bergman, B. (1996, Apr 08). Arctic myths and magic. Maclean's, 109, 75–76.

Ellis, Sarah. (2000). From Reader to Writer: Teaching Writing Through Classic Children's Books. Toronto: Douglas & McIntyre
 
Nicholls, Liz. "Michael Kusugak's Arctic Tales Warm Kids' Hearts." CanWest News: 1. May 31, 2005. ProQuest. Web. 4 Feb. 2014

Ruurs, Magriet."Michael Kusugak: Author Interview". The Bookmark 5.1, 2011: 30. Web. 1 Feb. 2014.

Saltman, Judith. "Canadian Children’s Literature at the Millennium" Windows and Words: A Look at Canadian Children's Literature in English. Susan-Ann Cooper, et al. Vol. 25. Ottawa: University of Ottawa Press, 2003. UBC ebrary. Web. 4 Feb. 2014.

External links
 Michael Kusugak
  in The Canadian Encyclopedia

1948 births
Canadian children's writers
Inuit from the Northwest Territories
Writers from Nunavut
Living people
Inuit writers
People from Rankin Inlet
Inuit from Nunavut